Salair may refer to:
Salair (town), a town in Kemerovo Oblast, Russia
Salair Ridge, an eroded highland in southwestern Siberia, Russia
Salair (airline), an American airline